Mark Lynch Blake (died 27 June 1886) was an Irish politician.

Lynch was educated at Trinity College, Dublin.
He was elected in 1840 as a Member of Parliament for Mayo, and held the seat until 1846.

References

External links 
 

Year of birth missing
1886 deaths
Members of the Parliament of the United Kingdom for County Mayo constituencies (1801–1922)
UK MPs 1837–1841
UK MPs 1841–1847
Irish Repeal Association MPs
Alumni of Trinity College Dublin